Grevillea iaspicula, commonly known as Wee Jasper grevillea, is a species of endangered shrub that is endemic to southern New South Wales.

Description
The branched, pendant inflorescences appear from late autumn to late spring. The perianths are green or cream coloured, flushed with light pink and the styles are pink or red. The fruit is a hairy follicle.

Taxonomy
Grevillea iaspicula was first formally described in 1986 by Donald McGillivray in his book, New Names in Grevillea (Proteaceae). The type specimen was found on private property in Wee Jasper in 1980. The specific epithet  iaspicula is a latinised form of Wee Jasper, the area where this species occurs.

In the Flora of Australia (1999), the species was positioned within the genus Grevillea by means of a hierarchical tree as follows:

Grevillea (genus)
Floribunda Group
Rosmarinifolia Subgroup

Grevillea iaspicula
Grevillea jephcottii
Grevillea lanigera
Grevillea baueri
Grevillea rosmarinifolia
Grevillea divaricata

Distribution
Grevillea iaspicula occurs in a restricted area in Wee Jasper and near Lake Burrinjuck among limestone-based rocky outcrops. Many populations are on private land.

Ecology
The species is believed to be pollinated by birds.

Conservation status
Grevillea iaspicula is listed as "endangered" under the Australian Government Environment Protection and Biodiversity Conservation Act 1999 and "critically endangered" under the New South Wales Government Biodiversity Conservation Act 2016. Potential threats include grazing, weeds, fire and drought. It is believed that survival of the species in the wild is unlikely without human intervention to artificially increase populations.

Use in horticulture
The species has only been brought in to cultivation in recent times and plants are not yet widely available beyond specialist nurseries. It exhibits a number of qualities which make it a suitable candidate for many gardens including adaptability to a range of soil types, responsiveness to pruning, and resistance to heavy frost. Plants may be propagated from cuttings.

References

External links
Grevillea iaspicula - Australian Plant Image Index

iaspicula
Flora of New South Wales
Proteales of Australia
Garden plants of Australia
Plants described in 1986
Taxa named by Donald McGillivray